Lepidomicrosorium is a genus of ferns in the family Polypodiaceae, subfamily Microsoroideae, with a single species, Lepidomicrosorium subhastatum, according to the Pteridophyte Phylogeny Group classification of 2016 (PPG I). Other sources do not accept the genus, submerging it into Tricholepidium, with Lepidomicrosorium subhastatum becoming Tricholepidium buergerianum (Miq.) Fraser-Jenk.

Phylogeny
A molecular phylogenetic study in 2019 suggested that Lepidomicrosorium was one of a group of closely related genera in the subfamily Microsoroideae, a group the authors termed "Lepisorus sensu lato". Its sole species was embedded in a clade in which none of the genera appeared to be monophyletic:

References

Polypodiaceae
Monotypic fern genera